Rishton is a district of Fergana Region in Uzbekistan. The capital lies at the city Rishton. The district consists of one city (Rishton), 13 urban-type settlements (Avazboy, Beshkapa, Bujay, Boʻston, Doʻtir, Saxovat, Zoxidon, Qayragʻoch, Oq-yer, Pandigon, Toʻda, Oʻyrat, Xurramobod) and 11 rural communities.

References

Districts of Uzbekistan
Fergana Region